United Nations Security Council Resolution 433, adopted unanimously on August 17, 1978, after examining the application of the Solomon Islands for membership in the United Nations, the Council recommended to the General Assembly that the Solomon Islands be admitted.

See also
 List of United Nations member states
 List of United Nations Security Council Resolutions 401 to 500 (1976–1982)

References
Text of the Resolution at undocs.org

External links
 

 0433
 0433
 0433
1978 in the Solomon Islands
August 1978 events